The enhanced entity–relationship (EER) model (or extended entity–relationship model) in computer science is a high-level or conceptual data model incorporating extensions to the original entity–relationship (ER) model, used in the design of databases.

It was developed to reflect more precisely the properties and constraints that are found in more complex databases, such as in engineering design and manufacturing (CAD/CAM), telecommunications, complex software systems and geographic information systems (GIS).

Mechanics

The EER model includes all of the concepts introduced by the ER model. Additionally it includes the concepts of a subclass and superclass (Is-a), along with the concepts of specialization and generalization. Furthermore, it introduces the concept of a union type or category, which is used to represent a collection of objects that is the union of objects of different entity types. EER model also includes EER diagrams that are conceptual models that accurately represent the requirements of complex databases.

Subclass and superclass
Entity type Y is a subtype (subclass) of an entity type X if and only if every Y is necessarily an X. A subclass entity inherits all attributes and relationships of its superclass entity. This property is called the attribute and relationship inheritance. A subclass entity may have its own specific attributes and relationships (together with all the attributes and relationships it inherits from the superclass). A common superclass example is a Vehicle superclass along with the subclasses of Car and Truck. There are a number of common attributes between a car and a truck, which would be part of the superclass, while the attributes specific to a car or a truck (such as max payload, truck type...) would make up two subclasses.

Tools

The MySQL Workbench offers creating, editing and exporting EER Models. Exporting to PNG and PDF allows easy sharing for presentations.
Skipper allows users to create, import and export from ORM schema definitions to editable EER models.
SAP PowerDesigner is a complex tool for modelling and transforming different models.

See also
Object–relational database
Slowly changing dimension
Structured type

References

Further reading
Textbooks discussing EER and implementation using purely relational databases:

Booklet discussing EER and implementation using object-oriented and object–relational databases:

Textbook discussing implementation in relational and object–relational databases:

Shorter survey articles:

External links
 - Slides for chapter 8 from Fundamentals of Database Systems by Elmasri and Navathe (Pearson, 2011)
 - Lecture notes from the University of Toronto
 - The ER Conference

Data modeling diagrams
 
Data modeling languages